Dear John may refer to:
Dear John letter, a break-up letter to an absent boyfriend or husband

Film and television
 Dear John (1964 film), a 1964 Swedish film
 Dear John (British TV series), a 1986–1987 British sitcom
 Dear John (American TV series), a 1988–1992 American sitcom, originally based on the British show
 Dear John (2010 film), a film based on the Nicholas Sparks novel (see below)

Literature
Dear John (novel), a 2007 novel by Nicholas Sparks
"Dear John", a column written for The Stage (UK) newspaper by John Byrne
Dear John: The Road to Pelindaba, 2018 book about Mark Constantine's search for his father

Music
 "Dear John" (Hank Williams song), the A-side of the 1951 single "Cold, Cold Heart"
 "A Dear John Letter" or "Dear John", a 1953 song by Ferlin Husky and Jean Shepard
 "Dear John", a song by Pat Boone, Dot Records 7"  45-16152, reached #44 in US charts in 1960
 "Dear John", a song by the Scottish hard rock band Nazareth, from their self-titled debut album (1971)
 "Dear John" by John Lennon, from John Lennon Anthology (1980)
 "Dear John" (Status Quo song) (1982)
 "Dear John", a song by Elton John from Jump Up! (1982)
 "Dear John" (Eddi Reader song) from her 1984 eponymous album
 "Dear John", an instrumental on the Freddie Hubbard album Bolivia (1991)
 "Dear John", a song by Cyndi Lauper from her 1993 album Hat Full of Stars
 "Dear John", a song by Klymaxx from One Day (1994)
 "Dear John", a song by Styx from their 1997 album Return to Paradise
 Dear John, a 1999 album by Ilse DeLange
 "Dear John Letter", a song by Whitney Houston from her 2002 album Just Whitney...
 "Dear John", a song by Aimee Mann from The Forgotten Arm (2005)
 "Dear John", a song by Ryan Adams from his 2005 album Jacksonville City Nights
 "dearjohn", a song by Musiq Soulchild from the 2008 album OnMyRadio
 Dear John, a 2009 album by Loney, Dear
 "Dear John", a song by Amerie from In Love & War (2009)
 "Dear John" (Taylor Swift song) (2010)
 "Dear John", a 2010 song by Jessie James Decker
 "Dear John (MC Lyte song)", a song by MC Lyte from their 2016 album Legend
 "Dear John", a song by James from their 2016 album Girl at the End of the World

See also
"Dear John Letter (To the Devil)", a song by Keith Green from No Compromise
"Dear Johnny", a song by Poe from Haunted